Angel Hriskov Rusev (Bulgarian: Ангел Христов Русев; born ) is a Bulgarian weightlifter.

Career

World Championships
He competed at the 2018 World Weightlifting Championships in the newly created 55 kg category. At the competition he set the youth world records in the snatch and total for the 55 kg weight class. In 2021 he competed at the 2021 World Weightlifting Championships in the 55 kg category, winning the gold medal in the clean & jerk portion and a bronze medal in the total.

European Championships
He competed at the 2019 European Weightlifting Championships in the 55 kg category, winning the gold medal in the clean & jerk portion and a silver medal in the total.

In 2021, he competed at the European Weightlifting Championships in the 55 kg category, winning the bronze in the snatch and the gold medal in the clean & jerk portion and in the total with new European Junior record.

Major results

References

External links
 

2001 births
Living people
Bulgarian male weightlifters
Place of birth missing (living people)
European Weightlifting Championships medalists
World Weightlifting Championships medalists
21st-century Bulgarian people